Tetraulax rothi is a species of beetle in the family Cerambycidae. It was described by Lepesme and Stephan von Breuning in 1955.

References

Tetraulaxini
Beetles described in 1955
Taxa named by Pierre Lepesme
Taxa named by Stephan von Breuning (entomologist)